The Edmonton Oilers are a professional ice hockey franchise based in Edmonton, Alberta. They play in the Pacific Division of the Western Conference in the National Hockey League (NHL).  They were founded in 1972 as a member of the World Hockey Association (WHA) and played in the WHA until 1979 when they joined the NHL. The team has had eleven general managers since their inception.

Key

General managers

See also
List of NHL general managers

Notes
 A running total of the number of general managers of the franchise. Thus any general manager who has two or more separate terms as general manager is only counted once.

References

 
Edmonton Oilers general managers
Edmonton Oilers
general managers